The 1990 Coppa Italia Final decided the winner of the 1989–90 Coppa Italia. It was held on 28 February and 25 April 1990 between Juventus and Milan. The first leg at the Stadio Comunale in Turin ended in a goalless draw while the second leg at the San Siro in Milan was followed two months later and ended in favour of Juventus, after the only goal scored by Roberto Galia.

First leg

Second leg

References

Coppa Italia Finals
Coppa Italia Final 1990
Coppa Italia Final 1990